La Turista is a play by the American playwright Sam Shepard, first performed at American Place Theatre, New York City in 1967, directed by Jacques Levy. The title refers to the most common illness among tourists. The two main characters are Salem and Kent, which are also the names of brands of cigarettes. It is a two-act dramatic play. The first act takes place in Mexico, and the second in the United States. Some see this play as a reference to the Vietnam war.

Production history
La Turista was first performed at the American Place Theatre in New York City, on March 4, 1967. The cast was as follows:

Salem – Joyce Aaron
Kent – Sam Waterston
Boy/Sonny – Lawrence Block
Doctor/Doc – Michael Lombard
Son – Joel Novack
Directed by: Jacques Levy

References

Extended Reading

 
 The New York Review of Books: CRITICS
 La Turista at the Internet Off-Broadway Database

Plays by Sam Shepard
1967 plays
Plays set in Mexico
Plays set in the United States